Daniel Kiely (born 10 May 1940) is an auctioneer and former Irish Fianna Fáil politician. He was a senator for many years and also served on Kerry County Council from the 1980s through to the 2000s.

Born in Tarbert, County Kerry, Kiely was elected in 1981 to the 15th Seanad, on the Labour Panel. At the February 1982 general election, he stood unsuccessfully for Dáil Éireann in the Kerry North constituency. This was the first of three successive defeats in Dáil elections: he also contested both the November 1982 and  1981 general elections without winning a seat.

Kiely did not contest the 1982 Seanad election, and failed to regain his seat when he stood again at the 1983 election.  He was re-elected at the 1987 election to the 18th Seanad, and held the seat until a further defeat at the but was defeated at the 2002 Seanad.

He was also a member of Kerry County Council for the Listowel electoral area, but was defeated at the 2004 local elections. He was co-opted to the Council in 2007 to replace Ned O'Sullivan who was elected to Seanad Éireann. Kiely was not re-elected to Kerry County Council at the 2009 local elections.

At the 2014 Kerry County Council election Kiely took a case to the Supreme Court for errors made in the election count. The court ordered a full recount for the first time in the history of the Irish State. However, after the recount, Kiely was still four votes behind and was not elected. He subsequently retired from politics.

References

1940 births
Living people
Fianna Fáil senators
Irish auctioneers
Local councillors in County Kerry
Members of the 15th Seanad
Members of the 18th Seanad
Members of the 19th Seanad
Members of the 20th Seanad
Members of the 21st Seanad